The Crown Prince of Country Music is the 1960 country music compilation album released by Starday Records of previously unissued recordings released in January 1960. The album's original release, like the reissue edition, did not chart.

The album repackages many of Jones' early recordings that were previously made available to the public in other record formats. The oldest track dates back to Jones' first session in January 1954. The album's reissue in 2015 included the previous LP release of 1959, and bonus tracks of singles.

Background
Soon after Starday had been completely taken in by Mercury in December 1959, the small Eastern Texas label was allowed to compile songs by Mercury artists as well as Starday artists. George Jones became a prime example, the talented young singer left Starday during the confusion, and began recording with Mercury. There, he took off, charting a Top 10 single multiple times every year since signing. An incredible #1 hit in "White Lightning" was released in early 1959, and during this time, Starday was on its knees.

After the merger, Starday president, Don Pierce, began producing multiple albums to publish featuring Jones' recordings with Starday and Mercury that never charted or wasn't previously included on an LP. This one, The Crown Prince of Country Music, was the first of the releases. Three would ultimately be released, and include many early Jones gems.

Track listing

Original version

Reissue

Personnel
Hal Harris – guitar
Benny Barnes – rhythm guitar
Buck Henson – bass
Link Davis – fiddle
Doc Lewis – piano

Reception
On Allmusic, Greg Adams wrote, "George Jones cut Starday Records' very first album, Grand Ole Opry's New Star, in 1956, and scored several hits for the label before moving to greener pastures at Mercury Records. Starday then issued The Crown Prince of Country Music in 1961 to capitalize on Jones' Mercury success by compiling an album of leftover tracks that had not previously appeared on album. As a result, there are no hits to be found, but rather an assortment of rarities such as the Hank Williams-esque ballad "You're in My Heart," which was the B-side of Jones' very first single, "There's No Money in This Deal." Elsewhere, Jones does his best Faron Young impression on "I've Got Five Dollars and It's Saturday Night," and flirts with rockabilly on "One Woman Man" and "Maybe Little Baby." Enthusiasts of Jones' early recordings will enjoy everything here, but the presentation is unfortunately marred by an electronically re-processed stereo effect. The Crown Prince of Country Music, like Jones' first album, Grand Ole Opry's New Star, contains a number of obscure tracks that have never been reissued on CD, so collectors can only hope that as these songs enter the public domain overseas, a comprehensive anthology of Jones' early sides will finally appear."

1960 albums
George Jones albums